Raymond Anthony Mercer (born April 4, 1961) is an American former professional boxer, kickboxer, and mixed martial artist who competed from 1989 to 2009. Best known for his boxing career, Mercer won a heavyweight gold medal at the 1988 Summer Olympics as an amateur, and later held the WBO heavyweight title from 1991 to 1992 as a professional. Boxrec ranks him as the world's No.9 heavyweight of 1990. As a mixed martial artist, he scored a notable first-round knockout win over former two-time UFC heavyweight champion Tim Sylvia in 2009.

Early life
Mercer, being the son of retired Army NCO Raymond Mercer Sr., grew up as a military brat in Fort Benning, Georgia, and later in Hanau, West Germany. He later recalled:

Mercer played linebacker at high school in Hanau, didn't plan to go for a college education. After graduating from Richmond County Military Academy in Augusta, Georgia, he coasted for a year before enlisting in the Army.

Military service
Mercer served with the USAREUR, V Corps, infantry, he was stationed with Company D, 1st Battalion, 39th Infantry, in Baumholder, West Germany. His latest military rank was sergeant.

Amateur boxing career
Mercer started boxing at the age of 23 while serving in the U.S. Army in West Germany. Mercer said he had never even put on a pair of gloves until after he enlisted, "The Army taught me everything I know about boxing," explained Mercer. While he had street fights as a youth, it wasn't until he was offered a chance to avoid a 30-day field exercise in the winter of 1984 by serving as a sparring partner for the post's heavyweight champion that he found a sanctioned way to use his aggression. The beginnings were tough. "I came back from that first day of sparring with a bleeding nose and my lips swollen. For two months I got pounded. But then it became a challenge. I'm not a quitter. I figured the other guy learned the moves, so could I." He learned quickly enough, winning military titles and a United States Amateur Boxing Federation title. He became 1985 U.S. Army and inter-service heavyweight champion, along with Wesley Watson, who was inter-service superheavyweight champion (Mercer later beat Watson as a professional). But in 1985, when Army Coach Hank Johnson sought to recruit Mercer for a stateside training camp for the 1988 Olympics, Mercer turned down the offer. "I was in my prime at partying. The training was not a sacrifice I wanted to make. I told Hank, you won't see me until the Olympics", he said. He first boxed in organized competition in 1983 at Schweinfurt, West Germany. He first won the brigade title after winning the battalion box-off. After that, Mercer claimed, "I won the VII Corps novice and open championships and finished second at U.S. Army, Europe. When he was reassigned to Baumholder, he won three USAREUR crowns while carrying the banner for V Corps (he won the USAREUR Championship less than a year after his first amateur fight.) As he served with USAREUR, for that reason in 1986—1987 Mercer had several international bouts in Germany, he also competed internationally at Western Europe open tournaments. In summer of 1988 he again won the inter-service heavyweight championship. His next step was to apply for the all-Army boxing trial camp and win a spot on the Army team. "Right now, I want to be the 'woodwork' man. I'm 26 years old and relatively unknown. My plans are to stay healthy, and I need to do well in international competition prior to the Olympics to build confidence."

He won the 1988 United States amateur heavyweight championship. At the USA vs. Cuba match-up, Mercer twice staggered Félix Savón, but was impeded from doing further damage by questionable intervention by the Cuban referee, Alfredo Toledo. At the USA vs. Europe match-up, Mercer with a hard right to the nose turned it into a "No mas!" fight for Yugoslavian Željko Mavrović.

1988 Olympics
Going to the Olympic Team, he was one of the most highly regarded American Olympic boxers. Of all the U.S. 1988 Olympians, Angelo Dundee, a legendary trainer, chose Ray Mercer and Andrew Maynard, as the most likely to develop into world champions after they would have turned into professionals: "Mercer's 27, but that's not too old. The maturity is there. And the punch. Give him 10 fights as a pro and he'd be ready to start moving up," Dundee said on Mercer's potential as a pro. According to Kelvin Richardson of the '88 All-Army Team, Mercer was such a hard puncher, that even 16-ounce gloves weren't of much help for his sparring partners from being knocked off the ring, and his superheavyweight Olympic teammate, Riddick Bowe, didn't want to spar with Mercer for that reason.

Before one of Maynard's fights, Mercer and Anthony Hembrick took off with their flags and good-naturedly dodged the people who tried to get in their way. A few tried to trip the pair, another tried to tackle the heavyweight Mercer, and one security guard even stopped him and tried to steer him back to his seat. Mercer would have none of it. "He didn't speak English, and I don't speak Korean, so he talked his stuff and I talked mine. I didn't think we connected, so I just kept on going." said Mercer. Soldiers from his unit back in Germany were rooting for him. Right before the Olympics they made a large banner with everyone's signature on it and shipped it overnight to Seoul. "They've been a big part of my support, and a gold medal would mean almost as much to them as it would to me. That banner really picked me up. I'm fighting for the people of the United States, but especially for the ones back in my unit," he told his audience during one of his post-fight interviews.

Mercer knocked out all four of his Olympic opponents, winning Gold of the 1988 Olympics in Seoul as a heavyweight. When asked if he thought he needed to stop the South Korean in order to win the gold medal, he replied: "Definitely. Or I'll make him wish he was knocked out. One of the two." He was the oldest member of the United States Olympic Boxing Team at 27.

Highlights

USAREUR Boxing Championships (heavyweight), Darmstadt, West Germany, May 1985:
Finals: Defeated Gregory Ellerbee
USA–USSR Duals (heavyweight), Troy, New York, October 1985:
 Defeated Renat Trishev (Soviet Union) by split decision, 2–1
 United States Armed Forces Championships (heavyweight), Camp Lejeune, North Carolina, November 1985:
 (no data available)
 Stockholm Box Open (heavyweight), Stockholm, Sweden, January 1986:
Finals: Lost to Magne Havnå (Norway) by split decision, 2–3
USA–FRG Duals (heavyweight), West Berlin, West Germany, July 1987:
 Defeated Andre Hoth (West Germany) RSC 2
USA–FRG Duals (heavyweight), Peissenberg, West Germany, July 1987:
 Defeated Andre Hoth (West Germany) by unanimous decision, 3–0
USA–FRG & Austria Duals (heavyweight), Neuhausen, West Germany, July 1987:
 Defeated Peter Neyer (Austria) by decision 
 Copenhagen Cup (heavyweight), Copenhagen, Denmark, December 1987:
Finals: Lost to Maik Heydeck (East Germany) by unanimous decision, 0–5
 United States Armed Forces Championships (heavyweight), Naval Air Station San Diego, San Diego, California, March 1988:
 Defeated Leonard Conway RSCH 1 
 United States National Championships (heavyweight), Colorado Springs, Colorado, March–April 1988:
1/16: Defeated Mike Sharp KO
1/8: Defeated Lyle McDowell RSC 2 
1/4: Defeated Ike Padilla RSC 2 
1/2: Defeated Carlton Hollis RSCH 1 
Finals: Defeated Jerry Goff by unanimous decision, 5–0

USA–Cuba Duals (heavyweight), Caesars Atlantic City, Atlantic City, New Jersey, April 1988:
 Lost to Félix Savón (Cuba) by split decision, 1–2
USA–Europe Duals (heavyweight), Las Vegas Convention Center, Las Vegas, Nevada, June 1988:
 Defeated Željko Mavrović (Yugoslavia) RSC 1 
Olympic Trials (heavyweight), Concord Pavilion, Concord, California, July 1988:
1/4: Defeated Tommy Morrison by unanimous decision, 5–0 
1/2: Defeated Carlton Hollis by unanimous decision, 5–0
Finals: Defeated Michael Bentt by unanimous decision, 5–0 
Olympic Box-offs (heavyweight), Caesars Palace, Las Vegas, Nevada, July 1988:
Day 1: Defeated Michael Bentt by split decision, 3–2 
USA–Canada Duals (heavyweight), Charlotte Coliseum, Charlotte, North Carolina, August 1988:
 Defeated Wayne Bernard (Canada) RET 2 
 Summer Olympics (heavyweight), Seoul, South Korea, September–October 1988:
1/8: Defeated Rudolf Gavenčiak (Czechoslovakia) RSCH 3 
1/4: Defeated Luigi Gaudiano (Italy) KO 1 
1/2: Defeated Arnold Vanderlyde (Netherlands) RSCH 2 
Finals: Defeated Baik Hyun-Man (South Korea) KO 1 

Mercer had a total of 70 fights as an amateur, competing all his amateur career in the 201-pound class, and compiling an amateur record of 64 wins, 6 losses (no stoppages.) Upon winning the Olympic Gold Medal, Mercer was approached by boxing promoter Bob Arum, with whom he signed a contract to turn professional. Under the deal, he was to be trained in Las Vegas, Nevada, under Hank Johnson of Fort Bragg, who was the All-Army Coach, and the assistant Olympic coach. Also under the deal, Arum got the rights to promote a certain number of televised bouts, leaving the boxer free to fight for others.

Upon winning the 1988 Olympics, he was named Armed Forces Athlete of the Year in November 1988 (which was quite an achievement, considering that the Army branch alone produced 19 Olympians in 1988.) In January 1989, being honorary discharged, Mercer left the Army to pursue a professional boxing career.

Professional boxing career

Mercer turned pro in January 1989 and debuted with a 3rd TKO of Jesse Hughes. He scored a series of knockouts and in August 1990 knocked down and outpointed big punching Smokin' Bert Cooper in a spectacular 12 round brawl that earned him Cooper's NABF title. In January 1991 he challenged undefeated Francesco Damiani for the WBO heavyweight title, scoring a one punch knockout victory in the 9th when behind on points. At that time the WBO championship wasn't considered a major championship, it didn't become a major belt equal to the WBA WBC and IBF belts until 2004. Later that year he beat undefeated puncher Tommy Morrison in five, and with a major world title fight on the horizon vacated his WBO belt and fought 42-year-old legend Larry Holmes rather than mandatory challenger Michael Moorer. It proved an unwise decision, as the crafty Holmes conned Mercer out of the fight, outjabbing the puzzled Mercer and gaining both the points decision, and Mercer's world title fight with heavyweight king Evander Holyfield.

Having split fights with dangerous veteran Jesse Ferguson (Mercer was investigated for allegedly asking Ferguson to "throw the fight" during their first encounter), labored when overweight to a draw with trialhorse Marion Wilson, and saw a proposed 1994 bout in Hong Kong with Frank Bruno fall through, Mercer enjoyed an unexpected run of form in major fights, losing on points in a thrilling brawl with Holyfield in May 1995, losing a controversial decision in another wild punch up, this time with Lennox Lewis, in June 1996, and scoring a controversial points win over ex-champ Tim Witherspoon in yet another high action bout in December 1996. In the frame for a bout with Andrew Golota in 1997, Mercer suffered a neck injury and was out of action for 14 months. He returned February 1998 with a 2-round KO of Leo Loiacono, but contracted Hepatitis B and was again inactive, this time for 20 months.

Comeback
In February 2001 a 39-year-old Mercer launched a final comeback, knocking out four journeymen before being matched with WBO title holder Wladimir Klitschko in a high-profile bout on HBO. Once famed for his incredible iron chin, Mercer looked his age and was knocked down in the first and stopped in the first time in his career, the 6th. A brief dalliance in the mixed martial arts nixed a 2004 bout with DaVarryl Williamson. However, Mercer did return to boxing in 2005, now aged 44, but he was stopped in seven rounds by Shannon Briggs.

Kickboxing career
Continuing to seek a fighting career, Mercer opted to travel to Japan and challenged Musashi in the kickboxing combat sport K-1 on June 6, 2004.  Mercer held a reasonable account of himself, but his age and inability to successfully defend kicks was evident as he went on to lose the bout via unanimous decision. On March 19, 2005, he had one more K-1 bout against Remy Bonjasky, to whom he lost via verbal submission. The first and only strike of the night, a head kick, landed square on the head of Mercer. It wasn't your typical fight; Mercer took the head kick and then quit the fight.. As Mercer put it, "I got the shit kicked out of me".

Mixed martial arts career
After a series of scheduled boxing matchups fell through (including a proposed bout against former champion Hasim Rahman), Mercer decided to try mixed martial arts (MMA) and approached Felix Martinez, co-founder of Cage Fury Fighting Championships, about working with the promotion. On March 21, 2007, Cage Fury announced that Mercer had signed to face underground street fighter and Internet legend Kimbo Slice at Atlantic City's Boardwalk Hall on June 23, 2007, as part of Cage Fury Fighting Championship 5. The bout was a non-sanctioned exhibition under the New Jersey Unified MMA rules.

Kimbo Slice won the fight in the first round with a guillotine choke submission. Mercer later stated in the press conference at Adrenaline III: Bragging Rights, when he was scheduled to fight Tim Sylvia under MMA rules instead of Boxing rules, that he had expected Kimbo Slice to box with him, and said that he did not really train in any other aspect of MMA and was unprepared for the guillotine choke.

On June 13, 2009, Mercer made a big splash when he defeated former UFC Heavyweight Champion Tim Sylvia at Adrenaline III: Bragging Rights. He won the fight via knockout in 9 seconds with a huge right hand to the chin, becoming the first man to ever defeat Sylvia by knockout.

In March 2010, it was announced that Mercer had signed with the King of the Cage organization, although no bouts would materialize.

Professional boxing record

Kickboxing record

Mixed martial arts record

Professional record

|-
| Win
| align=center | 1–0
| Tim Sylvia
| KO (punch)
| Adrenaline MMA 3: Bragging Rights
| 
| align=center | 1
| align=center | 0:09
| Birmingham, Alabama, United States
|

Exhibition record

|-
| Loss
| align=center | 0–1
| Kimbo Slice
| Submission (guillotine choke)
| Cage Fury Fighting Championship 5
| 
| align=center | 1
| align=center | 1:12
| Atlantic City, New Jersey, United States
|

References

External links

1961 births
African-American boxers
African-American mixed martial artists
American male kickboxers
American male mixed martial artists
Boxers at the 1988 Summer Olympics
Boxers from Florida
Heavyweight boxers
Heavyweight mixed martial artists
Mixed martial artists utilizing boxing
Kickboxers from Florida
Living people
Mixed martial artists from Florida
Olympic boxers of the United States
Sportspeople from Jacksonville, Florida
Heavyweight kickboxers
United States Army soldiers
Winners of the United States Championship for amateur boxers
World Boxing Organization champions
World heavyweight boxing champions
American male boxers
Olympic gold medalists for the United States in boxing
Medalists at the 1988 Summer Olympics
21st-century African-American people
20th-century African-American sportspeople